Slet is a suburb of Aarhus in Denmark.

References

Neighborhoods of Aarhus